Della Godfrey was an Indian politician belonging to Telugu Desam Party. She was a nominated Anglo-Indian member of the Andhra Pradesh Legislative Assembly. She served there for two terms.

Biography
Godfrey was born and raised up in Hyderabad. Her father Allen Godfrey was an engineer at the Royal Mint for the Nizam of Hyderabad and her mother Marjorie Godfrey was an educationalist, MP and MLA. She was a student of Rosary Convent High School and Koti Women's College. She worked as a manager of the Royal Dutch Airlines. She was a nominated member of Andhra Pradesh Legislative Assembly for two terms and served till 2004. She died on 23 April 2019.

References

2019 deaths
Telugu Desam Party politicians
Anglo-Indian people
Women members of the Andhra Pradesh Legislative Assembly
Osmania University alumni
Year of birth missing
Andhra Pradesh MLAs 1994–1999
Andhra Pradesh MLAs 1999–2004
20th-century Indian women
20th-century Indian people